Steven Lee Wagner (born March 6, 1984) is an American former professional ice hockey defenseman. He most notably played with the St. Louis Blues in the National Hockey League (NHL) before playing abroad for Adler Mannheim of the Deutsche Eishockey Liga (DEL).

Playing career
After two years in the USHL with the Des Moines Buccaneers and Tri-City Storm Wagner went to Minnesota State University, Mankato. He played three seasons with the Mavericks, having his most successful year during the 2006–07 season when he scored 29 points in 38 games. That year he was signed by the St. Louis Blues and also appeared in 14 games with the Blues minor league affiliate Peoria Rivermen, scoring 3 points.

For the 2007–08 season Wagner's solid play during training camp earned him an opening day spot on the Blues roster. He played his first NHL game in the season opener on October 4, 2007 against the Phoenix Coyotes in Phoenix where he played 22 shifts for 16:22 of ice time. In his second game he earned his first career assist, and on October 20, 2007, he scored his first career goal against his home state team, the Minnesota Wild.

On February 11, 2010, Wagner was traded by the Blues to the Pittsburgh Penguins in exchange for Nate Guenin.

On June 14, 2010, as an unrestricted free agent, Wagner re-signed to a one-year two-way contract with the Penguins. He was again reassigned as expected to spend the duration of the 2010–11 season playing for the Penguins AHL affiliate in Wilkes-Barre/Scranton. In the 2011 Calder Cup playoffs, Wagner became the first Wilkes-Barre/Scranton player to record a hat trick, scoring three goals in the first period against the Norfolk Admirals in a series clinching victory.

On June 9, 2011, Wagner signed a one-year deal with European DEL team, Adler Mannheim.

Career statistics

Awards and honors

References

External links

1984 births
Living people
Adler Mannheim players
American men's ice hockey defensemen
Des Moines Buccaneers players
Ice hockey players from Minnesota
Sportspeople from Grand Rapids, Minnesota
Minnesota State Mavericks men's ice hockey players
Peoria Rivermen (AHL) players
St. Louis Blues players
Tri-City Storm players
Undrafted National Hockey League players
Wilkes-Barre/Scranton Penguins players
Minnesota State University, Mankato alumni